Vigilante 8 is a vehicular combat video game developed by Luxoflux and published by Activision for PlayStation, Nintendo 64 and Game Boy Color. Although officially it has no connection to the Interstate '76 series, it features several of its themes (auto-vigilantes, the 1970s time frame, and specific fictional vehicle companies).

Gameplay

Home console versions
Players combat over a number of stages located over the western United States, whether in Story or Arcade Mode. Each stage has interactive features, such as ballistic missiles and launching Aurora planes for the Area 51 level. Every vehicle is equipped with a machine gun by default, but players can add up to three out of five available weapons - mines, auto-cannons, rocket pods, mortars, and homing missiles, plus a special weapon unique to the vehicle.

Three types of special attacks can be made using each of the five standard weapons, at a bigger cost in ammunition, by performing fighting game-style movements and button presses on the control pad. These attacks may be performed during normal play or to eliminate nearly-destroyed cars in a method called "Totaling." In line with the fighting-game style element, players can also score up to six combo hits called Whammies.

There are special icons scattered across the playing field; wrenches repair damage and yellow zigzag lines temporarily jam the opponent's homing-based weapons. Certain objectives in Story Mode must be completed to help unlock the game's secret characters and stages. The PlayStation version also offers players the option to play standard music CDs during a match.

The Nintendo 64 version includes a story mode for Y The Alien and a fantasy stage called Super Dreamland 64, as well as three multiplayer modes (two vs. two, three vs. one, and deathmatch) to take advantage of the system's four control ports, and a two-player Story Mode. A 480x360 hi-res mode is available from the pause menu if the Nintendo 64 Expansion Pack is installed. The Pack also enables a hidden 640x480 mode, available via password.

Game Boy Color version
The Game Boy Color (GBC) version features five levels, each one from the console versions: Casino City, Hoover Dam, Oil Fields, Ski Resort, and Valley Farms. The game also features five game modes, each one essentially identical, with only minor changes. The game's main story mode, Road Trip, takes the player through each level. The game features three difficulty levels. The player can choose from five different weapons, as well as a unique weapon assigned to each character. The game features digitized audio and voiceovers, as well as a two-player mode made possible with the use of a Game Link Cable. Unlike the console versions, environments in the GBC version are not destructible. The game features force feedback built into the cartridge.

Plot
Set in an alternate 1975, Australian terrorist Sid Burn is hired by OMAR to dispose of all competing oil companies in the U.S. so that OMAR can establish an oil monopoly in the country. After hearing reports of destruction by Sid Burn's gang, the Coyotes, a man named Convoy, a kind-hearted trucker, forms a group of his own, the Vigilantes, to combat the Coyotes and stop the tyranny of OMAR.

Characters
The game's protagonists are the Vigilantes, a group of residents from the Southwest who band together to preserve law and order in the light of chaos gripping the country. Their leader is Convoy, a rugged old cowboy driving a semi-trailer. He is accompanied in the fight by his rebellious niece Sheila; Las Vegas high-roller John Torque; Slick Clyde, whom Torque coerced into joining the Vigilantes; alien-obsessed hippie Dave, who somehow finds himself fighting with the Vigilantes; and FBI agent Chassey Blue, who was assigned to investigate reports of gun battles in the region.

The game's antagonists are the Coyotes, a group of hitmen recruited by OMAR to carry out their scheme by destroying commercial installations throughout the region using weaponry stolen from the top secret Site 4 military base in Nevada. Their founder is Sid Burn. His cohorts are disco-loving petty criminal Boogie; mentally-disturbed S4 test pilot Loki; Houston 3, a woman brainwashed by OMAR to become one of their assassins; beekeeper Beezwax, who was frustrated by the irradiation of his beehive; and juvenile delinquent Molo, who idolizes Sid Burn and is desperate to join the Coyotes.

An extraterrestrial being named Y The Alien appears in the game as a secret character.

Endings
Each character has their own ending, which is part of a bigger story.  Not all endings show a character being successful; in fact, most of the Coyote villain endings show the character facing a setback or failure of sorts and some endings depict a character defecting to the opposing faction.

Molo successfully passes the Coyotes' initiation, but loses his enthusiasm as he is given an assignment to wash Sid's car, much to his chagrin. Sid receives his payoff money from OMAR for his services, but is left stranded in the middle of nowhere because his car is out of gas. John Torque finds Sid and stashes him in his trunk.

Houston breaks free of OMAR's mind control and goes away with Convoy, who detaches the machineguns from his truck. Sheila barely misses them at a gas station and is forced to walk on the road, only for Convoy and Houston to arrive and pick her up. Clyde finds Houston's mind-control armband and, out of curiosity, wears it, resulting in him emerging as the Coyotes' new leader.

Chassey Blue embarks on a Hollywood career, releasing her self-titled movie based on the adventures of the Vigilantes. An alien ship abducts Dave in the middle of the night. In the ship, Dave is seen beating his alien host in what appears to be a game of checkers. The police arrest Boogie, who is convicted of a number of charges. Beezwax is elated at having acquired three nuclear warheads, only to see a stray bee land on and sting one of the warhead's fuses, triggering an explosion that kills him. Loki finds a flying saucer and is eager to fly it, but can't control the spaceship and causes it to crash, and he is later mistaken for a live alien UFO pilot.

In the N64 version of the game, the spaceship Loki flew and crashed is revealed to belong to Y The Alien, who was seeking extra fuel and parts for his ship after being stranded on Earth for some time looking for his friends.

Development
Vigilante 8 was developed with a team of five people - Peter Morawiec, Adrian Stephens, David Goodrich, Jeremy Engleman, and Edward Toth. The development company, Luxoflux, received no supporting code or technical assistance of any kind from Activision's in-house teams.
	
The development team rewrote all of the PlayStation's libraries except ones for which Sony did not supply information regarding direct hardware access.

During market research, the school bus emerged as a favorite vehicle among focus groups.

Reception

Vigilante 8 received "favorable" reviews on all platforms except the Game Boy Color version, which received "mixed" reviews, according to the review aggregation website GameRankings. Ryan MacDonald of GameSpot noted the easy control scheme and the well-designed graphics of the PlayStation version. MacDonald noted that the game's offerings would give reason for players to "retire" from Twisted Metal 2. Shawn Smith of Electronic Gaming Monthly noted the N64 multiplayer mode offered more fun and ran relatively smoothly in high-resolution mode. Edge gave the PlayStation version seven out of ten, calling it "a competent and interesting game for anyone who enjoys trashing automobiles. But the definitive car combat would probably exploit the sensation of cars driving at speed, while enabling players to indulge in violence." Next Generation gave both the Nintendo 64 and PlayStation versions favorable reviews in two separate issues, saying that the latter version was "more fun than Interstate '76 and currently the best game of its type on PlayStation" (#45, September 1998); and later saying of the former version, "If you're craving some driving action with guns for your N64, this is the title to get" (#53, May 1999). In Japan, where the PlayStation version was ported and published by Syscom on November 12, 1998, Famitsu gave it a score of 28 out of 40.

Sequel and remake

A sequel was produced, titled Vigilante 8: 2nd Offense, released for the PlayStation, Dreamcast, and Nintendo 64 in 1999. A remake for the Xbox 360, titled Vigilante 8 Arcade, was created by Isopod Labs, an independent company formed by the founders of Luxoflux. The game features a high-definition rendition of the past games plus some added multiplayer levels complete with an online mode. It was released onto Xbox Live Arcade on November 5, 2008. The developer of the two Vigilante 8 games, Luxoflux, produced a game very similar to Vigilante 8 using the Star Wars license (and the Vigilante 8 game engine), titled Star Wars: Demolition.

References

External links

1998 video games
Activision games
Alternate history video games
Game Boy Color games
Luxoflux games
Multiplayer and single-player video games
Nintendo 64 games
PlayStation (console) games
Vatical Entertainment games
Vehicular combat games
Vicarious Visions games
Video games scored by Alexander Brandon
Video games scored by Howard Drossin
Video games set in 1975
Video games set in the 1970s
Video games set in Arizona
Video games set in California
Video games set in Colorado
Video games set in the Las Vegas Valley
Video games set in New Mexico
Video games set in Nevada
Video games set in Utah
Video games with alternate endings
Video games developed in the United States